The Omaha metropolitan area, officially known as the Omaha–Council Bluffs, NE–IA, Metropolitan Statistical Area (MSA), is an urbanized region in Nebraska and Iowa in the American Midwest, centered on the city of Omaha, Nebraska. The region consists of eight counties (five in Nebraska and three in Iowa), and extends over a large area on both sides of the Missouri River. Covering  and with a population of 967,604 (2020),  the Omaha metropolitan area is the most populous in both Nebraska and Iowa (although the Des Moines–West Des Moines MSA is the largest MSA centered entirely in Iowa), and is the 58th most populous MSA in the United States. The 2003 revision to metropolitan area definitions was accompanied by the creation of micropolitan areas and combined statistical areas. Fremont, in Dodge County, Nebraska, was designated a micropolitan area. The Omaha–Council Bluffs–Fremont Combined Statistical Area has a population of 1,058,125 (2020 estimate).
 Approximately 1.5 million people reside within the Greater Omaha area, within a  radius of Downtown Omaha.

The region is locally referred to as "Big O", "the Metro Area", "the Metro", or simply "Omaha". The core counties of Douglas and Sarpy in Nebraska and Pottawattamie in Iowa contain large urbanized areas; the other five counties consist primarily of rural communities. The larger Omaha–Council Bluffs–Fremont, NE–IA, Combined Statistical Area (CSA) encompasses the Omaha–Council Bluffs MSA as well as the separate Fremont, NE, Micropolitan Statistical Area, which consists of the entirety of Dodge County, Nebraska.

Historical definitions and populations

Standard definitions for United States metropolitan areas were created in 1949; the first census which had metropolitan area data was the 1950 census. At that time, the Omaha–Council Bluffs metropolitan area comprised three counties: Douglas and Sarpy in Nebraska, and Pottawattamie in Iowa. No additional counties were added to the metropolitan area until 1983, when Washington County of Nebraska was added. Cass County, Nebraska, was added in 1993; Saunders County in Nebraska and Harrison and Mills counties in Iowa became part of the Omaha–Council Bluffs metropolitan area in 2003.

Components of the Omaha–Council Bluffs metropolitan area

Counties

Cities

Primary city 

Omaha – 486,051 inhabitants (2020)

Cities of 10,000 people or more (2020) 
Bellevue, Nebraska – 64,176 inhabitants (2020)
Council Bluffs, Iowa - 62,799 inhabitants (2020)
Papillion, Nebraska – 24,159 inhabitants (2020)
La Vista, Nebraska – 16,746 inhabitants (2020)
Fremont, Nebraska  - 26,437 inhabitants (2020)

Cities of 5,000 to 10,000 people (2020) 
Blair, Nebraska – 7,790 inhabitants
Glenwood, Iowa – 5,073 inhabitants
Gretna, Nebraska – 5,083 inhabitants
Plattsmouth, Nebraska – 6,544 inhabitants
Ralston, Nebraska – 6,494 inhabitants

Cities of 1,000 to 5,000 people (2019 estimates)

Cities and villages with fewer than 1,000 people (2019 estimates)

Census-designated places (2020) 
Chalco, Nebraska – 11,064 inhabitants
Offutt Air Force Base – 5,363 inhabitants

Annexations of formerly incorporated places by the City of Omaha

Notes

External links

Population for Iowa metropolitan areas and components, 1950 – 2000
omaha.towncommons.com – wiki website for the Omaha–Council Bluffs metro area

Geography of Omaha, Nebraska
Metropolitan areas of Nebraska
Metropolitan areas of Iowa
Regions of Iowa
Regions of Nebraska